Zeuzeropecten is a genus of moths of the family Cossidae.

Species
The species of this genus are:
Zeuzeropecten altitudinis (Viette, 1958)
Zeuzeropecten castaneus (Kenrick, 1914)
Zeuzeropecten clenchi Yakovlev, 2011
Zeuzeropecten combustus (Kenrick, 1914)
Zeuzeropecten dargei Yakovlev, 2011
Zeuzeropecten grandis (Viette, 1949)
Zeuzeropecten lactescens Gaede, 1930
Zeuzeropecten lecerfi (Viette, 1958)
Zeuzeropecten occultoides (Kenrick, 1914)
Zeuzeropecten tanzaniae Yakovlev, 2011
Zeuzeropecten zambica Yakovlev, 2011

References
Gaede, M. 1929–1930. Psychidae, Thyrididae, Metarbelidae, Aegeriidae, Cossidae, Hepialidae. – In: Seitz, A. (ed.) Die Gross-Schmetterlinge der Erde. Eine Systematische Bearbeitung der bis jetzt bekannten Gross-Schmetterlinge. Die Afrikanischen Spinner und Schwärmer. - — 14:481–488, 489–499, 501–513, 515–538, 539–551, 553–559

Zeuzerinae